The FS Class E.491 and E.492 were an Italian electric 25 kV 50 Hz AC locomotives built during the 1980s by the TEAM (Trazione Electrica Alternata Monofase) consortium, formed by FIAT ferroviaria, Ansaldo and other companies. The lines of the locomotive were designed by Italian designer Giorgetto Giugiaro. Group E.491 was designed to be used on freight trains (max speed ) while E.492 was designed for fast passenger trains (max speed ).

Intended use
They were intended to be used on the rail lines of Sardinia, at the time subject of future electrification. The project was later abandoned, but a lot of units had already been ordered and built, and since the catenary on the mainland is mostly 3 kV DC (except for high speed lines), and the locomotive was only able to run on 25 kV AC, the group never entered into active service.

Disposal
FS have tried to sell them to foreign railways (France and Bulgaria), but never succeeded. In 2008, the whole batch of 25 locomotives were sold to Fruilexport, a company established in Niš (Serbia). It seems thenceforth likely that they will be used on the Serbian 25 kV network.

References

External links 
 Photo gallery of the group

E.491
Bo′Bo′ locomotives
25 kV AC locomotives
Railway locomotives introduced in 1986
Gio. Ansaldo & C. locomotives
Standard gauge locomotives of Italy
Passenger locomotives
Bo′Bo′ electric locomotives of Europe